Richard Beaumont Waller  (born 5 December 1969) is an English barrister and former first-class cricketer.

The son of Sir Mark Waller, he was born at Islington in December 1969. He studied at Trinity College at the University of Cambridge, where he played first-class cricket for Cambridge University Cricket Club in 1991, making five appearances. Playing as a medium-fast bowler in the Cambridge side, he took 7 wickets at average of 51.85, with best figures of 3 for 31. A student of Gray's Inn, he was called to the bar in 1994 to practice as a barrister.

References

External links

1969 births
Living people
People from the London Borough of Islington
Alumni of Trinity College, Cambridge
English cricketers
Cambridge University cricketers
Members of Gray's Inn
English barristers
21st-century King's Counsel